= Pok Chi Lau =

Accredited Asian American photographer

- Born: April 21, 1950 (age 75); Hong Kong
- Known for: Artist, Photographer, Essayist

Pok Chi Lau (劉博智) is an accredited Asian American photographer that was born in Hong Kong on April 21, 1950. He was the fifth of seven children born to his mother Kam Chu Kwang and his father On Lau. He relocated to Canada in 1969 at the age of 19. Lau is a professional photographer who focuses on Chinese diaspora in countries around the world. Lau worked as an associate professor in the Design Department of the School of Fine Arts at the University of Kansas but is now retired.

== Themes ==
Much of Pok Chi Lau’s work focuses on Chinese diaspora, multiculturalism, and displacement. Having himself moved from Hong Kong at the age of 19, this is something that was personally experienced. The specific impetus for his work however was the time he spent working in a restaurant in Nova Scotia, during which he saw his first Chinatown. Since this moment, Lau has spent much of his career doing documentary work of Chinatowns in North America. He focuses not on the touristy aspects of these communities, but on the real lives of those behind the scenes.

Some of Lau’s work, like Teen-ager’s Room, Johnson County, Kansas (1984), highlights cultural changes and multiculturalism across decades. It has been argued that much of Lau’s work is more akin to documentary or visual sociology than to just photography.

His website is pokchilau.com

== Education ==
Lau attended elementary school in Hong Kong at Tung Wah Benevolent elementary school. In 1964 he attended Ying Wah College where he first gained an interest in Photography. He intended on attending school in Canada at Ontario College of Art, but was unable to get admission. In 1971 he moved to California to attend Brooks Institute of Photography where he majored in commercial, industrial, and scientific photography. At the age of 26, he was a graduate student at the California Institute of the Arts.

== Career ==
He is a professional photographer who focuses on the Chinese diaspora in countries around the world. In addition to his professional photography career, Pok Chi Lau is also a professional educator. He started as an Assistant Professor in Department of Design at The University of Kansas in 1977. In the years that followed he continued on with The University of Kansas, becoming the Associate Professor in the Department of Design during 1983. In 2004 he earned the title of Professor in the Department of Design at the University. He retired in 2013 to become an Emeritus Professor and continues to do significant work in Cuba and Mexico.

== Exhibitions ==
Lau’s work has been shown widely in the United States and abroad, much more so in China since 2006. The current (2020) exhibition, Migration, is at the Yuezhong Museum of Historical Images in Shenzhen, China.
